Apodynerus is an indomalayan genus of potter wasps.

References

 Nugroho H, Kojima J-i, Ubaidillah R (2014) Synonymy of the potter wasp genus Philippodynerus Gusenleitner (Hymenoptera, Vespidae, Eumeninae) with Apodynerus Giordani Soika, with taxonomic notes on Apodynerus species. Journal of Hymenoptera Research 36: 131–151. doi: 10.3897/JHR.36.6830

Biological pest control wasps
Potter wasps